Charles Harper Webb is an American poet, professor, psychotherapist and former singer and guitarist. His most recent poetry collection is Shadow Ball (University of Pittsburgh Press, 2009). His honors include a Whiting Award, a Guggenheim Fellowship, The Kate Tufts Discovery Award, a Pushcart Prize and inclusion in The Best American Poetry 2006. His poems have appeared in literary journals and magazines including American Poetry Review, Paris Review, and Ploughshares. Webb was born in Philadelphia in 1938, and grew up in Houston. He earned his B.A. in English from Rice University, and an M.A. in English from the University of Washington, and an M.F.A. in Professional Writing and his PhD in Counseling Psychology from the University of Southern California. He teaches at California State University, Long Beach, where he received a Distinguished Faculty Scholarly and Creative Achievement Award and the Distinguished Faculty Teaching Award, and he lives in Long Beach, California.

Honors and awards
 2001 Guggenheim Fellowship
 1999 Felix Pollack Prize, for Liver
 1998 Whiting Award
 1998 Kate Tufts Discovery Award, for Reading the Water
 1997 Morse Poetry Prize, for Reading the Water
 Academy of American Poets Prize

Published works
Full-Length Poetry Collections
 
 
 
 
 
 
 
 
 
 Poetry That Heals (Red Wind Books, 1991)
 Everyday Outrages (Red Wind Books, 1989)
 Zinjanthropus Disease (Querencia Press, 1978)

Anthologies Edited
 Stand-Up Poetry: An Expanded Anthology (University of Iowa Press, 2002)
 Stand-Up Poetry: The Anthology (California State University Press, 1994)
 Stand-Up Poetry: The Poetry of Los Angeles and Beyond (Red Wind Books, 1990)

References

External links
 Interview: Poem of the Week > Oct. 12, 2007 > An Interview with Charles Harper Webb by Andrew McFadyen-Ketchum
 Audio: 
 Poem: 
 Poem: Poetry Foundation > The Animals are Leaving by Charles Harper Webb
 Poem: 
 Essay: 

California State University, Long Beach faculty
20th-century American poets
Year of birth missing (living people)
Living people
University of Southern California alumni
University of Washington alumni
Rice University alumni
21st-century American poets
Writers from Philadelphia